The Coastal Lacrosse Conference (CLC) is a single sport intercollegiate athletic conference affiliated with the NCAA's Division III. The conference was formed between members of the Coast to Coast Athletic Conference and New Jersey Athletic Conference. Member institutions are located on the east coast in the states of Maryland, New Jersey, and Virginia.

History
The Coastal Lacrosse Conference was formed in 2022, the charter members were Christopher Newport University, Kean University, University of Mary Washington, Montclair State University, Salisbury University, and Stockton University. The conference will not receive automatic bids to the NCAA Division III Men's Lacrosse Championship until the 2025 season (2024-25 school year).

Member institutions

Current members

Membership timeline

References

External links
 

College lacrosse leagues in the United States
NCAA Division III conferences